Scottish Argentines are Argentine citizens of Scottish descent or Scottish-born people who reside in Argentina. A Scottish Argentine population has existed since at least 1825. Frequently, Scottish Argentines are wrongly referred to as English. Scottish Argentines celebrate Scottish culture and hold parades for Scottish celebrations, like Burns Night.

History
The first Argentine woman to earn a Doctor of Medicine degree was Cecilia Grierson, of Scottish ancestry. Two schools in Argentina have been founded by Scottish immigrants: St. Andrew's Scots School in 1838 and Balmoral College in 1959. In addition, the association football club Club Atlético Douglas Haig is named after the Scottish military commander Douglas Haig, 1st Earl Haig.

Argentine President Juan Domingo Peron had Scottish ancestry on his father's side. His great-grandmother, Ann Hughes Mc Kenzie, traced her roots to Scotland.

Introduction of football
The so-called "father of Argentine football" was a Glaswegian schoolteacher, Alexander Watson Hutton, who first taught football at St. Andrew's Scots School in Buenos Aires in the early 1880s. On 4 February 1884 he founded the Buenos Aires English High School [sic] where he continued to instruct the pupils in the game. In 1891 Hutton established the Association Argentine Football League, the first football league outside of the British Isles. Five clubs competed but only one season was ever played.

His son Arnold Watson Hutton (1886–1951) was an Argentine football striker for the Argentina national team. He also played cricket, tennis and waterpolo for Argentina.

Notable Scottish Argentines

 Alejandro Anderson, actor
 Andrew Graham-Yooll, author
 John Joseph Jolly Kyle, chemist, for whom the Premio "Dr. Juan J. J. Kyle" is named.
 Carlos Mac Allister, association football player, politician
 Alexis Mac Allister, association football player
 Duncan Stewart, Buenos Aires-born President of Uruguay
 Eduardo Mac Entyre, artist
 Franco Niell, association football player
 Jorge Brown, association football player
 José Luis Brown, association football player
 Luca Prodan, musician
 Roberto M. Levingston, General and de facto President of Argentina
 Walter Owen, translator
 Miguel Rolando Covian, Argentine physiologist, born in Rufino, Santa Fe province, medical educator and writer, translator
 Anya Taylor-Joy, actress
 Enrique Ernesto Shaw. Argentine businessman

See also

 Argentines of European descent
 St. Andrew's Scots School
 University of San Andrés
 English Argentine
Y Wladfa

References

External links
 St Andrew's Scots School (St. Andrew's Scots School)

 

Immigration to Argentina
Argentina